"Free Yourself" is a song by American singer Fantasia. It was written by rapper Missy Elliott, Craig Brockman, and Nisan Stewart for her debut album of the same name (2004), while production was helmed by Elliott, with Brockman credited as co-producer. The song was released as the album's fourth single on June 1, 2005 in United States where it peaked at number forty-one on the Billboard Hot 100, number three on the Hot R&B/Hip-Hop Songs and number one on the Adult R&B Airplay chart. "Free Yourself" was nominated for two Grammy Awards (Best R&B Song and Best Female R&B Vocal Performance), and is the winner of an ASCAP Rhythm and Soul Award.

Commercial performance
"Free Yourself" was released as the fourth single from Fantasia's debut album Free Yourself on June 1, 2005 in United States. It peaked at number forty-one on US Billboard Hot 100, number three on Hot R&B/Hip-Hop Songs and number one the US Adult R&B Airplay chart. It received two Grammy nominations in 2006: for Best R&B Song and Best Female R&B Vocal Performance. It won an ASCAP award (ASCAP Rhythm and Soul Award) for Most Performed Song in 2006.

Music video
The music video for "Free Yourself" was released in 2005 to promote the song, and, as of February 2023, it has over sixty-four million views.

Credits and personnel 
Credits adapted from the liner notes of Free Yourself.

Carlos Bedoya – mixing, recording
Craig Brockman – co-producer, keyboards, writer
Chris Brown – mixing assistance
Missy Elliott – background vocalist, producer, writer
Dave Heuer – mixing assistance
Nisan Stewart – drums, writer
Jazmine Sullivan – background vocalist

Charts

Weekly charts

Year-end charts

Awards and nominations

References

2005 singles
Fantasia Barrino songs
Songs written by Missy Elliott
Songs written by Craig Brockman
2004 songs
J Records singles
Contemporary R&B ballads
Soul ballads
2000s ballads
Songs written by Nisan Stewart